Seomoon Tak (born March 3, 1978), sometimes known mononymously as Tak, is a South Korean singer, noted for her powerful voice and technically skilled wide vocal range. Her debut album Asura has been among the top 20 popular karaoke songs in South Korea for more than 20 years. In 2002, she participated in the Red Devils Cheer, the support album for the South Korea national football team at the 2002 FIFA World Cup.

Biography
Seomoon Tak is an alumna of Berklee College of Music in Boston, Massachusetts, and majored in music production and engineering. She debuted in 1999 and sold her first album, Asura, over 300,000 copies and her second album, Seomoon Tak II, over 300,000 copies. After she debuted in South Korea, she regularly had more than 1,000 live performances per year, and radio and TV shows appearances. She released 6 studio albums (Korean), 2 studio albums (Japanese), and 2 single albums, and recorded multiple movie and television soundtracks. Marty Friedman, the guitarist of Megadeath, also featured her second Japanese album. 

Besides her recordings, she was cast as Yitzhak, the musical Hedwig and the Angry Inch and Acid Queen, and the musical The Who's Tommy in both Korea and Japan for many years. She is the first and only Asian Berklee student who was selected to perform for both "Singer's Night" and "Singer's Showcase" in front of over a thousand audiences at Berklee Performance Center for multiple times.
 
In 2012, she appeared on the South Korean singing competition television show I Am a Singer 2. She survived for five months until the final round of the season.
 
Upon the release of her second single in summer 2013, she started a project band, Seomoon Tak Band, which held several concerts in South Korea. Seomoon Tak has been performing in small and large venues around the world, including the latest performances in 2022 in New York City and New Orleans.  

In 2022, Seomoon Tak co-founded the TAK Company, an entertainment, food and beverage servicing company in the U.S. to promote Korean culture and entertainment.

Discography

Television Appearances
 National Singer (TvN) (2022)
 Immortal Songs (Season 2) (KBS)
 I wanna dance with somebody (2022)
 I look to you  (2022)
 Believer (feat. SF9 Inseong) (2021)
 Desperado (2021)
 The Power Of Love (2021)
 I Was Born To Love You (2019)
 Immortal Songs I (KBS)
 International Music Festival (2015)
 Seven Divas Special (2015) Final Winner
 To My Baby (Koo Chang Mo) (2015)
 Mona Lisa (2014)
 Concert 7080 (KBS) 2015
 Open Concert (KBS) 2015
 100 Songs (JTBC) 2015
 King of Mask Singer (MBC) (episodes 63, 64)
 Singing Battle (Moontak was a Hidden Card)(KBS) (2016)
 I Am A Singer (Season 2)
 Singer of October (MBC) (2012)
 Love Rain (MBC) (2012)

See also
 List of Koreans
 Contemporary culture of South Korea
 Korean music

References

External links
 
 Official Instagram
 Official YouTube Channel

1978 births
Living people
South Korean rock singers
21st-century South Korean singers
21st-century South Korean women singers